East Andover is an unincorporated village in the town of Andover, Oxford County, Maine, United States. East Andover has a post office with ZIP code 04226.

References

Villages in Oxford County, Maine
Villages in Maine